Rattlesnake is a crime drama mystery film written and directed by Zak Hilditch and starring Carmen Ejogo, Theo Rossi and Emma Greenwell. It was released on Netflix on October 25, 2019.

Plot
While stranded in the middle of the desert, Katrina's daughter, Clara, is bitten by a rattlesnake. With no cell service and time running out, Katrina meets a mysterious woman in a trailer who says she'll help. The bite appears to have vanished and when Katrina takes Clara to the hospital, it seems that everything is fine.

The doctor suggests it was just a hallucination. A mysterious man visits Katrina at the hospital to talk about her "payment" for Clara's recovery, declaring her soul was spared and must be repaid; the only conditions being that the soul Katrina takes must be human, and it must be paid on time. He gives her until sunset to repay the debt, otherwise Clara will die from the rattlesnake bite. Katrina doesn't initially believe it, but when she goes back to the desert road, the trailer has disappeared and she sees a trucker with a missing eye, warning that Clara is going to die.

Katrina discovers that the city of Tulia, Texas where she's ended up has been linked to a series of brutal murders and mysterious disappearances. Any time there's a photo or video of the crime scene, there's a mysterious shadowy figure in the background. The guy who visited her at the hospital is actually a lawyer who was fatally stabbed by a school teacher with the teacher saying "a soul for a soul" as he stabbed the lawyer, while a creepy kid who spooks Katrina actually went missing back in 2010. After an aborted attempt to kill a dying old man in the hospital, Katrina sets her sights on Billy, an abusive boyfriend she sees criticizing his girlfriend in a bar.

She breaks into their home and forces Billy to drive to a remote canyon in the desert. Before Katrina can kill him, though, he fights back and runs away. With time running out before sunset, Katrina prepares to kill herself, but as she films a goodbye message to Clara, Billy hits her with a rock and she blacks out. She wakes up just in time and when Billy is bitten by a rattlesnake, Katrina takes the opportunity to kill him to save her daughter. As she's watched over by mysterious figures on top of the canyon, Katrina leaves the canyon and on the way home, the doctor calls to say Clara is fine.

When Katrina reunites with her daughter, she sees that Clara has drawn a picture of the mysterious figure and the sun, seemingly aware of what her mother had to do. And when the pair get back on the road, Clara spots a hitchhiker by the road, who Katrina sees is actually Billy.

Cast
 Carmen Ejogo as Katrina Ridgeway
 Theo Rossi as Billy
 Emma Greenwell as Abbie
 Richard Lippert as Dying Man
 David Yow as Charlie
 Joy Jacobson as Loraine
 Arianna Ortiz as Francine
 Catherine Haun as Loraine's Sister
 Debrianna Mansini as The Woman
 Sean Dillingham as Dr. Hayes
 Stephanie Hill as Neighbor
 Jenna Doolittle as Female Nurse
 Alexandra Nell as Hiker
 Melissa Chambers as Disheveled Woman
 Tim Stafford as Male Nurse
 Apollonia Pratt as Clara
Bruce Davis as The Suit/ Donald Covington

Critical response 
The site's critics' consensus reads: "Carmen Ejogo is stranded in a wasteland both figuratively and literally in this disposable thriller, which lacks the cleverness or specificity to give its thin conceit any bite."

Reviewing the film for RogerEbert.com, Brian Tallerico praised the "game performance from the always-good Carmen Ejogo", but felt that the film's "biggest issue is the pacing" and director Zak Hilditch's failure to "find the tension to keep his story moving."

Writing for The Guardian, Benjamin Lee described the "undeniably talented" Ejogo as "adrift", Hilditch's direction as "bland", and the film overall as "strangely boring".

References

External links
 
 

2019 films
English-language Netflix original films
2019 crime drama films
African-American horror films
Films about snakes
Films set in deserts
2010s English-language films
2010s American films